Maurice Alberto Rocca (born January 28, 1969) is an American humorist, journalist, and actor. He is a correspondent for CBS Sunday Morning, the host and creator of My Grandmother's Ravioli on the Cooking Channel, and also the host of The Henry Ford's Innovation Nation on CBS. He was the moderator of the National Geographic Society's National Geographic Bee from 2016 until its final competition in 2019, as the 2020 and 2021 competitions were cancelled and the competition was ended in 2021. He is also the host of the podcast Mobituaries with Mo Rocca from CBS News. He is a regular panelist on the radio quiz show Wait Wait... Don't Tell Me!

Mo Rocca got his start in television behind the scenes, writing and producing several children's TV shows. His first work in front of the camera came as a correspondent for news satire show The Daily Show from 1998 to 2003. He played a similar role as a satirical correspondent for The Tonight Show with Jay Leno from 2004 to 2008, and later moved on to more serious (but still light-hearted) roles with CBS News for which he continues to work. He has also acted in theater, film, and on television in small roles from time to time, and has written two books.

Early life and work
Rocca was born in Washington, D.C.; his mother immigrated there from Bogotá, Colombia in 1956 at age 28, and his father was a third generation Italian-American from Leominster, Massachusetts. He attended Georgetown Preparatory School, a Jesuit boys' school in North Bethesda, Maryland. He graduated from Harvard University in 1991 with a Bachelor of Arts degree in literature. He served as president of Harvard's Hasty Pudding Theatricals, performing in four of the company's notorious burlesques and co-authoring one (Suede Expectations). While at Harvard, he also played Seymour in a production of Little Shop of Horrors which co-starred current Supreme Court Justice Ketanji Brown Jackson.

Career

Writing and producing
Rocca began his career acting on stage in the Southeast Asia tour of the musical Grease (1993) and Paper Mill Playhouse's South Pacific (1994).

His first television work was as a writer and producer for the Emmy and Peabody Award-winning children's television series Wishbone. He also wrote for The Wubbulous World of Dr. Seuss on the Nickelodeon TV channel and Pepper Ann on the ABC TV network.

In 2011, he won an Emmy as a writer for the 64th Annual Tony Awards.

Satire and journalism

From 1998 to 2003, Rocca was a regular correspondent for The Daily Show, which gave him his start in television. His work included campaign coverage for Indecision 2000 and a regular feature called "That's Quite Interesting".

In 2004, he served as a convention-floor correspondent for Larry King Live at the Democratic and Republican national conventions.

He was a regular correspondent for The Tonight Show on the NBC TV network from 2004 to 2008, and covered the 2008 election for NBC.

Rocca is a regular correspondent for CBS Sunday Morning with Jane Pauley. His work includes cover stories, features, and profiles (such as of Chris Rock and Amy Schumer) with an emphasis on presidential history.

He is a regular panelist on the quiz show Wait Wait... Don't Tell Me! on the NPR radio network.

In 2012, Rocca became a regular contributor to the then-new CBS This Morning.

Rocca turned his fascination with obituaries into a podcast called Mobituaries, currently on Season 3.

Author
Rocca's satirical book, All the Presidents' Pets: The Story of One Reporter Who Refused to Roll Over, deals with American presidents, their pets, and reporters and was published by Crown Books in 2004.

Rocca, parlaying from his Mobituaries podcast, authored Mobituaries in 2019, a book about underappreciated people in history such as Elizabeth Jennings Graham.

Food and other television
Rocca created and hosted the program My Grandmother's Ravioli with CBS Eye Productions on the Cooking Channel from 2012 to 2015, for which he traveled across the United States, learning to cook from grandmothers and grandfathers in their kitchens.

He previously hosted Food(ography) on the Cooking Channel and was a regular judge on Iron Chef America on the Food Network.

Rocca was a commentator on VH1's I Love the '70s and I Love the '80s. He was the host of Bravo's Things I Hate About You channel and Whoa! Sunday, which premiered in 2005 on the Animal Planet TV channel. He also made guest appearances for the Law & Order television franchise in the episodes "Authority" (Law & Order: Special Victims Unit) and "Contract" (Law & Order: Criminal Intent), both in 2008.

He is also the host of the weekly The Henry Ford's Innovation Nation program, which has aired as part of the CBS Dream Team on Saturdays since 2014.

On September 25, 2015, Rocca served as Lector during the Mass celebrated by Pope Francis at New York City's Madison Square Garden.

Broadway
On Broadway, Rocca played the role of Vice Principal Douglas Panch in The 25th Annual Putnam County Spelling Bee.

Film and other media
Rocca appeared in the 2005 film Bewitched and, in 2007, in the independent science-fiction family comedy I'll Believe You with fellow Daily Show alumnus Ed Helms. In 2012, Rocca was the narrator of the documentary Electoral Dysfunction, a movie which satirically analyzes the American voting system and which aired on PBS in 2012 and 2016.

He shared on social media a scripture reading (in Spanish) that he delivered while serving as Lector during Pope Francis's 2015 Mass at Madison Square Garden.

His contribution to AOL Newsbloggers was titled Mo Rocca 180°: Only Half as Tedious as the Regular News.

On May 13, 2015, Rocca appeared on a celebrity episode of Jeopardy! and came in second to CNN correspondent John Berman, amassing a total of $41,600.

Rocca began moderating the finals of the National Geographic Bee in 2016. Soledad O'Brien preceded him and Alex Trebek preceded O'Brien. He moderated the bee from 2016 until its final competition in 2019.

Rocca played a conservative morning TV show host in the second season of The Good Fight.

Personal life
In July 2011, Rocca revealed on The Six Pack podcast (episode 73) that he is gay. His participation in Pope Francis's September 2015 Mass in Madison Square Garden was hailed by gay rights advocates.

References

External links

Mo Rocca Interview on LX.TV
Official Mobituaries Website

1969 births
21st-century American comedians
American people of Colombian descent
American people of Italian descent
American satirists
American television personalities
Harvard University alumni
American gay actors
American gay writers
American LGBT broadcasters
Gay comedians
Living people
Writers from Washington, D.C.
LGBT people from Washington, D.C.
People from Bethesda, Maryland
LGBT people from Maryland
Hispanic and Latino American writers
Hispanic and Latino American male actors
Hispanic and Latino American people in television
LGBT Hispanic and Latino American people
American LGBT journalists
American LGBT comedians